is a 1982 Japanese novel by Junichi Watanabe. The story has been adapted for television three times.

1983 adaptation
The 1983 television adaptation was titled .

2006 adaptation
The 2006 adaptation is a Korean show titled Cloud's Stairs.

2013 adaptation
The latest adaptation stars Hiroki Hasegawa as the main character. This series began on 17 April 2013.

References

External links
2006 series official site 
2013 series official site 

1982 Japanese novels
Japanese medical television series
Japanese drama television series
Nippon TV dramas